Plain City is a village in Madison and Union counties in the U.S. state of Ohio, along Big Darby Creek. The population was 4,225 at the 2010 census. According to the official website, their mission statement is "to govern with integrity and fiscal responsibility providing quality services and programs to promote prosperity, safety and the well-being of our citizens and community".

History

Until about 1800, the Ohio Country was inhabited by Mingo and Wyandot Indians, and there was an Indian village just north of present-day Plain City. After 1795, as white settlers began moving into the region, the area around present-day Plain City was referred to as Pleasant Valley. This name remained in use into the 20th century, appearing in the Ohio Guide of the late Depression era.

In 1814, Isaac Bigelow travelled to the area from Centre County, Pennsylvania, to pay for land purchased from his uncle, then returned to Pennsylvania to study medicine with his father. He returned in 1817, and settled in the Pleasant Valley area in 1818. He hired a surveyor named David Chapman, and laid out the town of Westminster on June 11, 1818. At the time, Westminster lay wholly within Darby Township in Madison County. In 1820, when Union County was formed, the county line was moved to the middle of Westminster. In 1823, the previous survey was resurveyed, additional territory was incorporated, and the town's name was changed from Westminster to Pleasant Valley. From 1832 to 1851, there were six additions to the town limits. In 1851, due to there already being another town in Ohio named Pleasant Valley, the town changed its name to Plain City.

Previous to 1850, Plain City was a smaller trading point than Amity, but after a trunk-line for the Atlantic and Great Western Railroad was laid through its corporation limits, business and manufacturing increased dramatically. The corporation limits were extended in 1868. As of 1875, the town contained five churches, one newspaper, one bank, one brick planing mill, one flour mill, four dry goods stores, three drug stores, three grocery stores, one jewelry store, one hotel, one carriage and wagon store, two harness shops, two wagon shops, two blacksmith shops, and a boot and shoe store.

The Farmers National Bank, a building at the intersection of State Route 161 and Chillicothe Street, was built in 1902, and was listed on the National Register of Historic Places in 1995. The town clock, located at the same intersection, was dedicated on November 15, 1902.

An Amish settlement at Plain City that was founded in 1896 dissolved in 2011.

The village has grown in recent years with the addition of new housing developments. Darby Fields on the south side of the village broke ground in 2017. Darby Station on the east side of the village broke ground in 2022.

Geography
Plain City is located at the juncture of U.S. Route 42 and State Route 161, eight minutes from Dublin and 12 minutes from Marysville.

Demographics

The population of Plain City was about 700 in 1875, 1,245 in 1890, 1,432 in 1900, 1,407 in 1910, and about 1,500 in 1915.

2010 census
As of the census of 2010, there were 4,225 people, 1,609 households, and 1,150 families living in the village. The racial makeup of the village was 96.0% White, 0.6% African American, 0.7% Native American, 0.7% Asian, 0.2% from other races, and 1.9% from two or more races. Hispanic or Latino of any race were 1.5% of the population.

There were 1,609 households, of which 37.6% had children under the age of 18 living with them, 56.3% were married couples living together, 11.1% had a female householder with no husband present, 4.1% had a male householder with no wife present, and 28.5% were non-families. 25.4% of all households were made up of individuals, and 11.4% had someone living alone who was 65 years of age or older. The average household size was 2.63 and the average family size was 3.16.

The median age in the village was 37.2 years. 29.3% of residents were under the age of 18; 6.1% were between the ages of 18 and 24; 28.2% were from 25 to 44; 21.6% were from 45 to 64; and 14.8% were 65 years of age or older. The gender makeup of the village was 47.1% male and 52.9% female.

According to the 2019: ACS 5-Year Estimates Subject Tables, 94.6 percent of people above 25 in the village were at least a high school graduate or higher; and 35.6 percent of people had a bachelor's degree or higher as well.

2000 census
As of the census of 2000, there were 2,832 people, 1,128 households, and 753 families living in the village. The population density was 1,563.2 people per square mile (604.1/km). There were 1,201 housing units at an average density of 662.9 per square mile (256.2/km). The racial makeup of the village was 96.93% White, 0.78% African American, 0.14% Native American, 0.28% Asian, 0.04% Pacific Islander, 0.74% from other races, and 1.09% from two or more races. Hispanic or Latino of any race were 1.20% of the population.

There were 1,128 households, out of which 36.6% had children under the age of 18 living with them, 51.6% were married couples living together, 10.9% had a female householder with no husband present, and 33.2% were non-families. 28.3% of all households were made up of individuals, and 12.1% had someone living alone who was 65 years of age or older. The average household size was 2.51 and the average family size was 3.10.

In the village, the population was spread out, with 28.0% under the age of 18, 7.8% from 18 to 24, 32.8% from 25 to 44, 18.8% from 45 to 64, and 12.6% who were 65 years of age or older. The median age was 34 years. For every 100 females there were 93.0 males. For every 100 females age 18 and over, there were 89.4 males.

The median income for a household in the village was $43,313, and the median income for a family was $51,007. Males had a median income of $35,382 versus $23,351 for females. The per capita income for the village was $20,815. About 4.3% of families and 6.1% of the population were below the poverty line, including 6.2% of those under age 18 and 11.1% of those age 65 or over.

Arts and culture

The village's public park is Pastime Park, and features baseball and softball diamonds, camping facilities, a  nature walking path, two children's play parks, and the village's public pool, Pastime Pool.

Each year, during the month of July, the village hosts the Miami Valley Steam Threshers show at Pastime Park, which showcases antique tractors, steam threshers and other farm equipment.

Government
The village and surrounding area is serviced by the Jonathan Alder Local School District and Jonathan Alder High School.

Plain City is served by the Plain City Public Library, holding over 64,000 volumes with over 125 periodical subscriptions.

Notable people
 Jonathan Alder, pioneer and settler
 Israel Beachy, bass guitarist
 James Dillion, 1952 Summer Olympics bronze medalist
 Perry A. Frey (born 1935) biochemist
 Arnett Howard, jazz musician
 Herbert Huffman, musician and choir director; founder of the American Boychoir School
 Donnie Nickey, NFL player

References

External links
 
 Plain City Public Library

Villages in Madison County, Ohio
Villages in Union County, Ohio
Villages in Ohio
Populated places established in 1818